"Comin' Home" is a song written and recorded by Canadian artist City and Colour. It was released in 2006 as the second single from the album Sometimes.

Charts

Music video
The music video was directed by Chris Sargent. It is in black and white and shows Dallas playing in different rooms, with scenes showing a woman in (what appears to be) some of the same rooms, but never at the same time as Dallas.

The song is referenced in a Cancer Bats music video for their song Pneumonia Hawk, where a group of men (played by the band members, along with Alexisonfire vocalist George Pettit and producer Greg Below) sing the song at the end.

External links

References

2006 singles
City and Colour songs
Country ballads
2005 songs
Songs written by Dallas Green (musician)
Dine Alone Records singles